Epics In Minutes is a compilation of singles by the band Fucked Up released March 16, 2004 on Deranged Records. The band states in the liner notes that “this is the closest that there will ever be to a Fucked Up retrospective.” Some of the versions on this compilation are different from the ones that were originally released on the singles.

Track listing 

2004 compilation albums
Fucked Up albums
Deranged Records albums